"Louise" is a song written by Leo Robin and Richard A. Whiting for the 1929 film Innocents of Paris, where it was performed by Maurice Chevalier. The song was Chevalier's first hit in the United States, and was among the best selling records for 10 weeks in the summer of 1929. Chevalier recorded the song again in 1946 with Henri René's Orchestra for RCA Victor.

Other recordings

The same year of Chevalier's recording, Bing Crosby also recorded the song. Crosby's version was recorded on March 15, 1929 with Paul Whiteman and his orchestra and was a hit in that summer. Crosby also recorded a comedy version with The Rhythm Boys on April 10, 1929.
Ben Pollack & His Central Park Orchestra, vocal Charles Roberts, (recorded March 1, 1929 for Victor Records – catalog No. 21941A). 
Frankie Trumbauer (recorded April 17, 1929 for Okeh Records, catalog No. 41231). 
Benny Goodman (recorded December 12, 1938 for Victor Records, catalog No. 26125).
Dean Martin recorded the song and his version was included in his 1953 album Dean Martin Sings.
Pierre Lalonde's cover of "Louise" hit No. 1 on the Québec charts in 1964.

Film and television appearances
1929 Innocents of Paris – sung by Maurice Chevalier
1944 You Can't Ration Love – sung by Betty Rhodes and Johnnie Johnston
1945 The Lost Weekend – played on piano and sung by Harry Barris at Harry and Joe's.
1951 The Stooge
1953 Desi Arnaz, Lucille Ball, William Frawley, and Vivian Vance each sang a portion of the song, in a manner imitating Chevalier, on the I Love Lucy episode, "The French Revue".
1954 The Country Girl
1963 A New Kind of Love
1973 Robert Reed sang a portion of the song on an episode of The Brady Bunch, "A Room at the Top".
1974 Harry and Tonto – sung by Art Carney.
1988 'Allo 'Allo!- sung by Arthur Bostrom.

References

External links
Fan Page: "Louise through ages" & forum

1929 songs
Bing Crosby songs
Songs written for films
Songs with lyrics by Leo Robin
Songs with music by Richard A. Whiting
Maurice Chevalier songs
Victor Records singles
Okeh Records singles